"Open Pit Mine" is a murder ballad by George Jones.  It was composed by Delbert T. Gentry and released as Jones' third single for United Artists in 1962.

Background
"Open Pit Mine" is a first person narrative that tells the story of an unnamed Arizona copper miner and his wife Rosie.  The man states that "there was nothing for Rosie that I wouldn't do" and it is her love that inspires him to continue with his dreary work.  However, after learning that she has been having an affair, he shoots her and her lover "while their arms were entwined" and buries her body in the open pit mine.  The final verse of the song is ambiguous, implying suicide:

I took a look at my future 
and what did I see?
There was nothing but trouble 
awaiting for me
But on the sun's next risin 
I'll be satisfiedCause they'll find me there sleeping 
by my sweet Rose's side

The song was atypical for Jones, containing no chorus and sparse, folk-tinged instrumentation. The song reached number 13 on the country singles chart.  He would recut the song a few years later on the Musicor label.

1962 singles
George Jones songs
Year of song missing
United Artists Records singles
Murder ballads
Song recordings produced by Pappy Daily